Harrington Bridge crosses the River Trent near Sawley in Derbyshire carrying the Tamworth Road (B6540) into Leicestershire. The stonework of the bridge dates from 1790, but the central section was replaced in 1905 after it was damaged by flood water. The central section is the only part of the bridge that is not a listed building.

History
Crossings at this point date at least from the 14th century when several timber bridges were built. Although one lasted 80 years, they were all washed away and in 1321 a ferry at Sawley was initiated.

The existing bridge dates from 1789 to 1790 and was designed by the bridge engineer and architect, Thomas Harrison of Lancaster.  The new bridge was a toll bridge and everyone except locals living in Sawley or Hemington (in Leicestershire) were required to pay the toll. The Lord of the Manor and his servants were also specifically excluded from toll charges. In 1792, a ford to the west of the bridge became impassable as a result of a weir built at Redhill in Nottinghamshire which must have increased the income from tolls. The Lord of the Manor from 1779 was Charles Stanhope, 3rd Earl of Harrington.

The Act of Parliament authorising the construction of the bridge dates from 1788.

The first bridge was washed down by the great flood before it was completed, previous to which here was a ford. The bridge was erected by shareholders, at a cost of around £4,000, and tolls were levied to those crossing the bridge until 1882.

The bridge was damaged in floods during 1904. In 1906 a two-span riveted steel girder bridge was erected replacing the central section, retaining the original stone approach arches. The remaining parts of the original bridge are recorded in the National Heritage List for England as designated Grade II listed buildings.

It now carries Tamworth Road, the B6540, (formerly the A453) over the river providing a link between Leicestershire and Derbyshire.

See also
List of works by Thomas Harrison
Listed buildings in Sawley, Derbyshire

References

Sources
Inland Waterways Association, Aegre Region Newsletter 114, page 26 July 2006
Inland Waterways Association, Aegre Region Newsletter 115, page 25 November 2006

External links

Bridges in Leicestershire
Bridges in Derbyshire
Bridges across the River Trent
Grade II listed buildings in Leicestershire
Grade II listed buildings in Derbyshire
Bridges completed in 1790
Thomas Harrison buildings
Former toll bridges in England
Grade II listed bridges
1790 establishments in England